Tillandsia subg. Pseudovriesea is a subgenus of the genus Tillandsia.

Species
Species accepted by Encyclopedia of Bromeliads as of October 2022:

Tillandsia andreettae 
Tillandsia arpocalyx 
Tillandsia barclayana 
Tillandsia barthlottii 
Tillandsia boeghii 
Tillandsia castaneobulbosa 
Tillandsia cereicola 
Tillandsia chontalensis 
Tillandsia crenulipetala 
Tillandsia curvispica 
Tillandsia didistichoides 
Tillandsia drewii 
Tillandsia engleriana 
Tillandsia espinosae 
Tillandsia fragrans 
Tillandsia hansonii 
Tillandsia harmsiana 
Tillandsia heterandra 
Tillandsia hitchcockiana 
Tillandsia incurva 
Tillandsia karinae 
Tillandsia kentii 
Tillandsia kickae 
Tillandsia limonensis 
Tillandsia myriantha 
Tillandsia olmosana 
Tillandsia patula 
Tillandsia penduliscapa 
Tillandsia pereziana 
Tillandsia peruviana 
Tillandsia petraea 
Tillandsia porphyrocraspeda 
Tillandsia robusta 
Tillandsia spathacea 
Tillandsia strobeliae 
Tillandsia tequendamae 
Tillandsia tillandsioides 
Tillandsia werneriana 
Tillandsia yaconorensis

References

Plant subgenera
Pseudovriesea